Wislow Island is an island in the Fox Islands group of the eastern Aleutian Islands in the U.S. state of Alaska. It was named in 1888 by the U.S. Bureau of Fisheries.

References

Fox Islands (Alaska)
Islands of Aleutians West Census Area, Alaska
Islands of Alaska
Islands of Unorganized Borough, Alaska